Eld (English: Fire) is the third studio album by Norwegian heavy metal band Enslaved. It was released on 7 April 1997, through Osmose Productions.

Background 

The man featured on the album cover is Enslaved vocalist Grutle Kjellson.

Track listing

Personnel 
 Enslaved

 Ivar Bjørnson – guitar, keyboards, production
 Grutle Kjellson – bass guitar, vocals, production, sleeve booklet photography
 Harald Helgeson – drums, production

 Production

 J.W.H. (Jannicke Wiese-Hansen) – logo designer
 Pytten (Eirik Hundvin) – production, engineering
 J. Traaen (Jørgen Træen) – engineering
 Karl Henrik Nymo – sleeve band photography
 S. Johnsen – sleeve booklet photography

References 

Enslaved (band) albums
1997 albums
Season of Mist albums